On Twitter, a word, phrase, or topic that is mentioned at a greater rate than others is said to be a "trending topic" or simply a "trend". Trending topics become popular either through a concerted effort by users or because of an event that prompts people to talk about a specific topic. These topics help Twitter and its users to understand the current trending hashtag worldwide what is happening and what people's opinions are about it.

Trending topics are sometimes the result of concerted efforts and manipulations by fans of certain celebrities or cultural phenomena. Twitter has altered the trend algorithm in the past to prevent manipulation of this type with limited success.

Impact 
Examples of high-impact topics include the wildfires in San Diego, the earthquake in Japan, popular sporting events, and political uprisings in Iran and Egypt.

Controversies 
Twitter often censors trending hashtags that are claimed to be abusive or offensive. Twitter censored the #Thatsafrican and #thingsdarkiessay hashtags after users complained that they found the hashtags offensive. There are allegations that Twitter removed #NaMOinHyd from the trending list and added an Indian National Congress-sponsored hashtag.

In 2019, 20% of the global trends were found to be fake, created automatically using fake and compromised accounts originating from Turkey. It is reported that 108,000 accounts were employed since 2015 to push 19,000 keywords such as advertisements and political campaigns, to top trends in Turkey by bulk tweeting.

See also

 Twitter usage—How various people and organizations use Twitter

References

Trends
 
Technology in society